The fêtes de Bayonne is a feria consisting in a series of festivals in the Northern Basque Country in the town of Bayonne. The festival lasts 5 days and always starts the Wednesday before the first Sunday of August. It is the largest festival in France. In the eighties, participants started to dress in white with a red scarf and a red belt after the colours of the city of Pamplona. Some rare purists prefer to wear blue and white, the colours of the city of Bayonne.

The festivals include musical and street performances, traditional dances, parades, and fireworks.

The first "Fêtes de Bayonne," called "The Big Summer Festival," took place on July 13, 1932. It was instigated by a group of friends belonging to the Aviron Bayonnais rugby team. 
They wanted to create celebrations similar to those of San Fermin in Pamplona, Southern Basque Country (famous for their Running of the Bulls) in Bayonne.

Gallery

External links
 www.fetes-de-bayonne.com 
 www.fetes-traditionnelles.fr/fetes-de-bayonne_explication-37.html

Festivals in France
Labourd
Tourist attractions in Pyrénées-Atlantiques
Bayonne